Minata Keita (born March 15, 1989) is a Malian basketball player for Celta de Vigo and the Malian national team.

She participated at the 2017 Women's Afrobasket.

References

1989 births
Living people
Centers (basketball)
Malian expatriate basketball people in Spain
Malian women's basketball players
Sportspeople from Bamako
21st-century Malian people